Sulaqan (also Romanized as Sūlaqān and Sūleqān; also known as Sūgān and Sulughan) is a village in Qahan Rural District, Khalajastan District, Qom County, Qom Province, Iran. At the 2006 census, its population was 81, in 18 families.

References 

Populated places in Qom Province